Hugh Barker (died 1632) was an English lawyer.

He was educated at New College, Oxford. He was master of the free grammar school at Chichester, when it was attended by jurist John Selden, who received from him his instruction in 'grammar learning.' On 17 June 1605 he graduated D.L. at Oxford, being about this time chancellor of the diocese. He was admitted to Doctors' Commons on 9 June 1607, and for several years before his death, in 1632, he was dean of Arches Court in London. He was buried in the upper end of the New College chapel, Oxford, where his virtues are commemorated in a Latin epitaph and where an "elaborate monument" made by Nicholas Stone honors him.

References

1632 deaths
English lawyers
Alumni of New College, Oxford
Members of Doctors' Commons
Year of birth unknown